Arnulf I (c. 893/899 – 27 March 965), called "the Great", was the first Count of Flanders.

Life
Arnulf was the son of margrave Baldwin II of Flanders and Ælfthryth of Wessex, daughter of Alfred the Great. Through his mother he was a descendant of the Anglo-Saxon kings of England, and through his father, a descendant of Charlemagne. Presumably Arnulf was named either after Saint Arnulf of Metz, a progenitor of the Carolingian dynasty, or King Arnulf of Carinthia, whom his father supported.

At the death of their father in 918, Arnulf became Count of Flanders while his brother Adeloft or Adelolf succeeded to the County of Boulogne. However, in 933 Adeloft died, and Arnulf took the countship of Boulogne for himself, but later conveyed it to his nephew, Arnulf II. Arnulf titled himself count by the Grace of God.

Arnulf I greatly expanded Flemish rule to the south, taking all or part of Artois, Ponthieu, Amiens, and Ostrevent. He exploited the conflicts between Charles the Simple and Robert I of France, and later those between Louis IV and his barons.

In his southern expansion Arnulf inevitably had conflict with the Normans, who were trying to secure their northern frontier. This led to the 942 murder of the Duke of Normandy, William Longsword, at the hands of Arnulf's men. The Viking threat was receding during the later years of Arnulf's life, and he turned his attentions to the reform of the Flemish government.
Count Arnulf died on 27 March 964, allegedly murdered by Heluin in revenge for the murder of William Longsword.

He was buried in the Saint-Peter's Abbey in Ghent.

Family
The name of Arnulf's first wife is unknown but he had at least one daughter by her:

 Name unknown; married Isaac of Cambrai. Their son Arnulf succeeded his father as Count of Cambrai.

In 934 he married Adele of Vermandois, daughter of Herbert II of Vermandois. Their children were:

 Hildegarde, born  934, died 990; she married Dirk II, Count of Holland. It is uncertain whether she is his daughter by his first or second wife.
 Liutgard, born in 935, died in 962; married Wichmann IV, Count of Hamaland.
 Egbert, died 953.
 Baldwin III of Flanders (c. 940 – 962), married Matilda of Saxony († 1008), daughter of Hermann Billung.
 Elftrude; married Siegfried, Count of Guînes.

Succession
Arnulf made his eldest son and heir Baldwin III of Flanders co-ruler in 958, but Baldwin died untimely in 962, so Arnulf was succeeded by Baldwin's infant son, Arnulf II of Flanders.

See also

Counts of Flanders family tree

References

Additional references
Folcwine
Lambert of Ardres
 Platts, Beryl. The Scottish Hazard: Flemish Nobility and their Impact on Scotland, 1985

890s births
964 deaths

Year of birth uncertain
House of Flanders
Arnulf 1
Counts of Boulogne
10th-century people from West Francia